The Democratic Study Group (DSG) was a caucus consisting of liberal members of the Democratic Party in the United States House of Representatives, which also operated as a legislative service organization (LSO). It was founded in 1959 and was active until 1994. It was founded "as a liberal counterpoint to the influence of senior conservatives and southern Democrats," and played a crucial role in passing liberal legislation in spite of the opposition of the conservative coalition during the late 1950s and 1960s. After the 1970s, its role focused on legislative service, whose "principal activity [was] to disseminate detailed written materials to members of the House about upcoming legislation and policy issues, which it [did] on a daily basis when the chamber [was] in session."

Chairs
Rep. Lee Metcalf (MT-1)
Rep. John Brademas (IN-3)
Rep. James G. O'Hara (MI-12)
Rep. Frank Thompson (NJ-4)
Rep. Donald M. Fraser (MN-5)
Rep. Phillip Burton (CA-5)
Rep. Tom Foley (WA-5)
Rep. Abner J. Mikva (IL-10)
Rep. Dave Obey (WI-7)
Rep. Matthew F. McHugh (NY-28)
Rep. Jim Oberstar (MN-8)
Rep. Mike Lowry (WA-7)

Further reading
Polsby, Nelson W. "How Congress Evolves", New York: Oxford University Press 2004 
Stevens Jr., Arthur G., Miller, Arthur H., Mann, Thomas E., "Mobilization of Liberal Strength in the House, 1955-1970: The Democratic Study Group," The American Political Science Review, Vol 68. No. 2. (Jun., 1974), pp. 667–681.At J-STOR

References

External links
Abner Mikva Interview No. 4
A search crew recovered the body of Richard Conlon
When Liberals Were Organized

See also
Conservative Coalition
Legislative Digest
United States Democratic Party
History of the United States Congress

Political organizations based in the United States
Organizations established in 1959
Democratic Party (United States) organizations